Brad L. Glenn (born January 26, 1972) is an American football coach and the current offensive coordinator at Cincinnati. He previously served as the quarterbacks coach and passing game coordinator for Virginia Tech under Coach Brent Pry.

Early life
Glenn was born in Seneca, South Carolina. An alumnus of Clemson University, Glenn owns a bachelor’s degree from the university, graduating in 1995

Coaching career
Glenn is a college coaching veteran holding experiences at Appalachian State, Western Carolina, and Georgia State.

After the 2022 season, Glenn became the offensive coordinator at Cincinnati joining the staff of Scott Satterfield whom coached with Glenn from 2005–2007 at Appalachian State.

References 

Date of birth missing (living people)
1972 births
Living people
People from Seneca, South Carolina
Coaches of American football from South Carolina
Clemson University alumni
High school football coaches in South Carolina
Elon Phoenix football coaches
North Greenville Crusaders football coaches
Appalachian State Mountaineers football coaches
Western Carolina Catamounts football coaches
Georgia State Panthers football coaches
Virginia Tech Hokies football coaches